Norman Fucking Rockwell! is the sixth studio album by American singer-songwriter Lana Del Rey released on August 30, 2019, by Polydor and Interscope Records. The album was primarily produced by Del Rey and Jack Antonoff, with additional contributions from Zach Dawes, Andrew Watt, and longtime Del Rey collaborator Rick Nowels. Musically, Norman Fucking Rockwell! features a soft rock sound consisting of psych-rock songs and piano ballads and features references to various classic rock artists. The title of the album is a reference to painter and illustrator Norman Rockwell.

Norman Fucking Rockwell! received universal acclaim. Music critics praised Del Rey's musical progression with the album and her refined and poetic lyricism as well as the album's production. The album debuted at number one in seven countries, including the United Kingdom, becoming Del Rey's fourth number one album in the country, and reached the top 5 in over twenty countries, including the United States, where it peaked at number three on the Billboard 200, becoming Del Rey's fourth consecutive top 5 album in the nation.

Five singles were released to promote the album; "Mariners Apartment Complex", "Venice Bitch", "Hope Is a Dangerous Thing for a Woman Like Me to Have – but I Have It", "Doin' Time", and "The Greatest". Del Rey embarked on her fifth concert tour, The Norman Fucking Rockwell! Tour. It started on September 21, 2019, and ended on November 30, 2019.

At the 62nd Annual Grammy Awards, it was nominated for Album of the Year, while the title track received a nomination for Song of the Year. Norman Fucking Rockwell! was frequently listed by numerous publications as the best album of the year, and since its release has been regarded as one of the greatest and most revered albums of the decade and of all time, with Rolling Stone ranking it on their list of the 500 Greatest Albums of All Time.

Background
When in attendance at the 60th Annual Grammy Awards, Del Rey confirmed in an interview that she had begun work on her next album. She revealed the title of one song, "Bartender", saying that she did not know if it would make the album's tracklist. The album was recorded under the working title Bird World in its earlier stages of developement. In September 2018, Del Rey premiered the album's second single, "Venice Bitch", in Zane Lowe's Beats 1 show, and joined for an interview where she confirmed that the album's title and its title track would be Norman Fucking Rockwell!. She revealed that the album was nearly complete having recorded eleven tracks for it. It was later reported that the album was scheduled for an early 2019 release. In October 2018, Del Rey performed alongside Jack Antonoff, whith whom she had collaborated on the record, at an Apple Music event, where she premiered the song "How to Disappear". On December 31, 2018, Del Rey teased the song "Happiness Is a Butterfly" on social media. A snippet of the album's title track was shared by Del Rey in June 2019. In July 2019, Del Rey performed at the FIB Benicàssim Festival, where she revealed that the album would be released the following month.

Composition
FLOOD Magazine described the album's sound as "a mellow soft rock" and noted Del Rey's improved lyrics tackle larger themes than her previous work. According to critics, Norman Fucking Rockwell! features "psych-rock jams" and piano-based ballads. Consequence of Sound described the record as featuring "psych-pop lullabies, tales of complicated, consuming romantic love, and overt odes to the tarnished dream of California." It has been characterised as a "pop classic", as well as embodying folk rock, and existing somewhere between the desert rock and "minimalist" trip hop of Del Rey's previous efforts.

The album features a strong influence from 1970s classic rock. Kitty Empire of The Observer noted that "strings and synth washes soundtrack multiple love songs", and also noted several classic rock references throughout the album, including Neil Young's "Cinnamon Girl", Crosby, Stills, & Nash, and Led Zeppelin's Houses of the Holy. Rob Sheffield of Rolling Stone noted the album's "Laurel Canyon '70s soft-rock fantasies", including references to Joni Mitchell and the Eagles.

No Ripcord described Norman Fucking Rockwell! as "a remarkably sharp pop record that retains her fascination with pop-culture iconography and the rosey simplicity of a post-war America where classic rock and blue jeans ruled and takes them to much deeper places".

Release and promotion
The album's cover art, release date, and track listing were announced by Del Rey on July 31, 2019. The cover art features Del Rey and Duke Nicholson—actor Jack Nicholson's grandson—posing on a sailboat, with the album title and Del Rey's initials written in a comic-inspired style. The photo was taken by Del Rey's sister Chuck Grant. The following day, Del Rey released an album trailer. On August 2, Urban Outfitters announced an exclusive vinyl of the album featuring an alternative album artwork, also photographed by Chuck Grant.

Throughout 2018, Del Rey shared snippets via social media of several songs intended for the album, including "Happiness Is a Butterfly", "How to Disappear", and "Cinnamon Girl". 
She performed "How to Disappear" on October 29 at the Brooklyn Academy of Music, debuting the full song for the first time.
A trailer for the album was released on August 1, 2019. It features three of the album's singles—a cover of Sublime's "Doin' Time", "Mariners Apartment Complex", and "Venice Bitch"—as well as the title track. On August 22, 2019, "Fuck It I Love You" and "The Greatest" were released as promotional singles, along with a double music video. The music video runs at 9:19 minutes long, with the same shoot as the album trailer.

Singles
"Mariners Apartment Complex" was released as the album's first single on September 12, 2018. The following week, on September 18, Del Rey released the second single, "Venice Bitch" and revealed the album title.  "Hope Is a Dangerous Thing for a Woman like Me to Have – but I Have It" followed as the third single on January 9, 2019.

Del Rey released a cover of Sublime's "Doin' Time" on May 17, 2019, for a documentary about the band; its music video was released on August 29, 2019, one day before the release of Norman Fucking Rockwell! A double music video for "Fuck It I Love You" and "The Greatest" was released on August 22, 2019; "The Greatest" was later released as the album's fifth single on September 13, 2019, in Italy.

Tour

On August 1, 2019, Del Rey announced two legs of a tour in promotion of Norman Fucking Rockwell!. The first leg took place in North America in the fall of 2019 and the second in Europe in early 2020. The European leg of the tour was subsequently cancelled due to illness.

Film

On December 20, 2019, Del Rey released a 14-minute-long short film featuring the songs "Norman Fucking Rockwell", "Bartender", and "Happiness is a Butterfly". The film was directed by Chuck Grant and premiered on YouTube.

Critical reception

Norman Fucking Rockwell! received widespread acclaim from music critics and is also the most critically acclaimed studio album of Del Rey's career to date. At Metacritic, which assigns a normalized rating out of 100 to reviews from mainstream publications, the album received an average score of 87 based on 28 reviews, indicating "universal acclaim".

Jenn Pelly of Pitchfork wrote that the album "establishes [Del Rey] as one of America’s greatest living songwriters". In his review for Rolling Stone, Rob Sheffield wrote "the long-awaited Norman Fucking Rockwell is even more massive and majestic than everyone hoped it would be. Lana turns her fifth and finest album into a tour of sordid American dreams, going deep cover in all our nation's most twisted fantasies of glamour and danger." He concluded that Del Rey "has finally made her pop classic." In a five-star review for NME, Rhian Daly called the album "nothing short of stunning." Kristel Jax of Now wrote "Del Rey has shifted her kitschy patriotic fixation, dropping her flag-draped persona and making peace with a more complex, dystopian reality", also giving the album five stars. For Slant Magazine, Sal Cinquemani described the album as "a heady collection of psych-rock and piano dirges that pour into each other and rarely shift tempo from track to track" as well as "frank assessments of the psychic effects of a world spiraling into chaos." Also writing positively, Alexandra Pollard of The Independent wrote "The album is sultry and soporific, sitting somewhere between the minimalist trip-hop of Del Rey’s early days, and the scuzzy desert rock she has toyed with over the years," and concluded that "This is Del Rey at her most assertive." In his 'premature evaluation' for Stereogum, Tom Breihan wrote that the album is "a beautiful opus for a new dark age — a fond look back at the world we just wrecked", calling it "yoga music for the apocalypse."

In a more mixed review, Alexis Petridis of The Guardian described the album as "an alternately beguiling and frustrating experience", concluding that despite Del Rey's evident talent, "it's hard not to wish that she would broaden her perspective, adopt a different persona, shake things up a little." Neil McCormick of The Daily Telegraph similarly wrote that the album "reveals Del Rey to be something of a one trick pony, but what a beautiful trick it is."

Accolades
In 2021, Pitchfork readers voted Norman Fucking Rockwell! the 17th-greatest album overall, and the best album by a female artist, of the previous 25 years.

Year-end lists 
The album was placed in numerous year-end lists of 2019, topping those by many publications. According to Metacritic, it was the most named album in the year-end rankings of 2019 albums by critics.

Decade-end and All-Time lists

Commercial performance
Norman Fucking Rockwell! debuted at number three on the US Billboard 200 chart, earning 104,000 album-equivalent units (including 66,000 copies in pure album sales) in its first week, becoming Del Rey's sixth US top ten album on the chart. In its second week, the album dropped to number nine, earning an additional 35,000 units.

In the United Kingdom, Norman Fucking Rockwell! debuted at number one on the UK Albums Chart, selling 31,539 copies, becoming her best sales week in the country since Ultraviolence (her following album, Chemtrails over the Country Club, would open up with higher weekly sales than Norman Fucking Rockwell!). The album became Lana Del Rey's fourth number one album in the UK, tying Taylor Swift as the female artist with the most solo number one albums in the UK during the 2010s. In France, the album sold 8,000 copies in its first week, 800 more than Lust for Life's first week.

Track listing 

Notes
 Digital releases of the album feature the single version of "Fuck It I Love You", which credits different personnel than the album version.
  signifies someone solely credited on physical releases.
  signifies someone solely credited on digital releases.
  signifies an additional producer
  physical releases of the album include an outro on "Hope Is a Dangerous Thing for a Woman like Me to Have – but I Have It", making the length 5:58.
 All track titles are stylized in sentence case, except “Mariners Apartment Complex”, “Venice Bitch”, “Cinnamon Girl” and “The Next Best American Record” which are stylized in title case, and “Hope Is a Dangerous Thing for a Woman like Me to Have – but I Have It” in all lowercase.

Credits and personnel

Technical
 Laura Sisk – recording engineering , mixing 
 Jack Antonoff – recording engineering , mixing 
 Paul LaMalfa – recording engineering , mixing 
 John Congleton – recording engineering 
 Dean Reid – recording engineering , mixing 
 Kieron Menzies – recording engineering , mixing 
 Trevor Yasuda – recording engineering 
 Jon Sher – assistant recording engineering 
 Derrick Stockwell – assistant recording engineering 
 Greg Eliason – assistant recording engineering 
 Ben Fletcher – assistant recording engineering 
 Billy Cumella – assistant recording engineering 
 John Rooney – assistant recording engineering 
 Tate McDowell – assistant recording engineering 
 John Rooney – assistant recording engineering 
 Nicolas Jodoin – assistant recording engineering 
 Travis Pavur – assistant recording engineering 
 John Christopher Fee – assistant recording engineering 
 Chris Rockwell – assistant recording engineering 
 Ryan Hendrickson - assistant recording engineering 
 Şerban Ghenea – mixing 
 John Hanes – mix engineering 
 Andrew Watt – mixing 
 Chris Gehringer – mastering 
 Will Quinnell – assistant mastering engineering 
 Dave Kutch – mastering 

Musicians
 Lana Del Rey – vocals, horns 
 Jack Antonoff – keyboards , piano , drums , programming , acoustic guitar , electric guitar , synthesizers , percussion , vibraphone 
 Evan Smith – saxophone , flute 
 Phillip Peterson – baritone , cello , flugelhorn 
 Victoria Parker – violin 
 Laura Sisk – additional programming 
 Josh Klinghoffer - guitar 
 Chad Smith - drums 
 Mikey Freedom Hart – keyboards , Mellotron , piano , drums , programming 
 Andrew Watt – instrumentation , programming , guitar 
 Eric Wilson – bass guitar 
 Josh Freese – drums 
 Bud Gaugh – drums 
 Gale Levant – harp 
 Woozy Biff – harp 
 Zachary Dawes – piano 
 Loren Humphrey – drums 
 Darren Weiss – drums 
 Mike Riddleberger – drums 
 Sean Hutchinson – drums 
 Evan Weiss – guitar 
 Benji Lysaght – guitar 
 Tyler Parkford – Hammond B3 
 Dean Reid – bass guitar , keyboards , guitar , FX , programming 
 Kieron Menzies – Mellotron , drums , FX , programming 
 Rick Nowels – keyboards , acoustic guitar , piano 
 Grace Wang – keyboards 
 Zac Rae – keyboards 
 David Levita – guitar

Charts

Weekly charts

Year-end charts

Certifications and sales

See also
 List of number-one albums of 2019 (Scotland)
 List of UK Albums Chart number ones of the 2010s

References

External links

2019 albums
Lana Del Rey albums
Albums produced by Andrew Watt (record producer)
Albums produced by Happy Perez
Albums produced by Rick Nowels
Albums produced by Jack Antonoff
Albums recorded at Electric Lady Studios
Norman Rockwell
Soft rock albums by American artists
Psychedelic rock albums by American artists
Pop albums by American artists
Folk rock albums by American artists
Psychedelic pop albums